The following ships of the Royal Danish Navy have borne the name HDMS Diana:

 , a sloop of war in service 1804–1809
 , a corvette in service 1818-1822
 , a frigate in service 1823–1850
 , a schooner corvette in service 1864–1903
 HDMS Diana, a patrol vessel in service 1917–1935
  a  launched in 1954 and decommissioned in 1974.
  a  launched in 2006.

References

Royal Danish Navy ship names